The 2017–18 Ranji Trophy was the 84th season of the Ranji Trophy, the premier first-class cricket tournament that took place in India between October 2017 and January 2018. Vidarbha won the tournament, beating Delhi by 9 wickets in the final, to win their first Ranji Trophy title. Vidarbha made their Ranji Trophy debut in the 1957–58 season, making it the third-longest wait before a team won their maiden title. Vidarbha's captain, Faiz Fazal, said that "winning the Ranji Trophy has been the biggest achievement in my career".

The previous season was played at neutral venues. For this season, the Board of Control for Cricket in India (BCCI) agreed to return to playing fixtures at home and away venues after the neutral venue trial was unpopular with domestic captains. However, the knock-out phase of the tournament was still played at neutral venues. The other change from the previous season was an increase in the number of groups from three to four, with each team playing six fixtures in the group stage. The top two teams from each group progressed to the quarter-finals.

Gujarat were the defending champions. The season started on 6 October 2017, with the quarter-finals taking place on 7 December 2017, the semi-finals on 17 December 2017, and the final being held from 29 December 2017 to 2 January 2018. The final was played at the Holkar Stadium, Indore for the second consecutive year.

In November 2017, Mumbai, the most successful team in the history of the Ranji Trophy, played their 500th match in the competition.

Following the conclusion of the sixth round of group-stage fixtures, Karnataka and Delhi from Group A and Vidarbha from Group D had all progressed to the knockout stage of the tournament. After the final group-stage matches, they were joined by Gujarat and Kerala from Group B, Madhya Pradesh and Mumbai from Group C and Bengal from Group D. It was the first time that Kerala had progressed to the quarter-finals of the Ranji Trophy.

In the quarter-finals, Karnataka beat Mumbai by an innings and 20 runs. It was only the fifth time that Mumbai had lost a match by an innings in the history of the Ranji Trophy. Defending champions Gujarat drew their match with Bengal, with Bengal progressing to the semi-finals with a first-innings lead. In the other quarter-final matches, Delhi beat Madhya Pradesh by seven wickets and Vidarbha beat Kerala by 412 runs to advance.

In the first semi-final, Delhi beat Bengal by an innings and 26 runs to reach their first final since the 2007–08 tournament. In the second semi-final, Vidarbha beat Karnataka by 5 runs to reach the final for the first time in their history.

Player transfers
The following player transfers were approved ahead of the season:

Teams
The teams were drawn in the following groups, with the groupings based on the average points for each side in the previous three years:

Group A
 Assam
 Delhi
 Hyderabad
 Karnataka
 Maharashtra
 Railways
 Uttar Pradesh

Group B
 Gujarat
 Haryana
 Jammu & Kashmir
 Jharkhand
 Kerala
 Rajasthan
 Saurashtra

Group C
 Andhra Pradesh
 Baroda
 Madhya Pradesh
 Mumbai
 Odisha
 Tamil Nadu
 Tripura

Group D
 Bengal
 Chhattisgarh
 Goa
 Himachal Pradesh
 Punjab
 Services
 Vidarbha

Group A

Points table

Group B

Points table

Group C

Points table

Group D

Points table

Knockout stage
The draw for the quarter-finals were made after the final group-stage match, with the following fixtures announced. The fixtures in the knockout stage of the tournament are played across five days, instead of four days in the group stage.

Quarter-finals

Semi-finals

Final

References

External links
 Series home at ESPN Cricinfo

Ranji Trophy seasons
Ranji Trophy Trophy
Ranji Trophy
Ranji Trophy